"ASAP" is a 2001 pop / R&B song performed by Australian pop group Bardot, and was the first single from their second and studio album Play It Like That, while it was released as Bardot's second single in the UK. The fast tempo R&B track is about a partner's interfering mother.

History
ASAP is written and produced by Swedish duo Murlyn. The song was recorded in the UK initially with Katie Underwood's vocals but was later removed after she had left the group.

Track listing
Australian CD single (0927403302)
 "ASAP" - 3:45
 "ASAP" (Studio 347 Dance Radio Edit) - 3:12
 "ASAP" (Studio 347 R 'N' B Mix) - 3:17
 "ASAP" (Studio 347 House Mix Extended) - 4:41

UK CD single
 "ASAP"
 "Poison"
 "Do It for Love"
 "ASAP" (Enhanced Video)

Charts

Weekly charts

Certifications

References

2001 singles
Bardot (Australian band) songs
Songs written by Henrik Jonback
2001 songs
Warner Music Group singles
Song recordings produced by Henrik Jonback